Tin Mountain is an unincorporated community in Madison County, in the U.S. state of Missouri.

The community took its name from nearby Tin Mine Mountain.

References

Unincorporated communities in Madison County, Missouri
Unincorporated communities in Missouri